() is an enzyme with systematic name  (adding 9--11 isopentenyl units). This enzyme catalyses the following chemical reaction

 (2Z,6E)-farnesyl diphosphate + n isopentenyl diphosphate  n diphosphate + trans,polycis-polyprenyl diphosphate (n = 9 - 11)

This enzyme has the highest activity with (2Z,6E)-farnesyl diphosphate as allylic substrate.

References

External links 

EC 2.5.1